Vending machines being rocked or tilted have been known to cause serious injury and death when the heavy machines fall over.

Users may rock machines in order to obtain free products, release stuck products, or obtain change.(1 January 1992). Soft-drink machine crushes woman who kicked it, Sun Journal (Associated Press) The U.S. Consumer Product Safety Commission found in a 1995 study that at least 37 deaths and 113 injuries had occurred due to falling vending machines from 1978 to 1995. This resulted in a voluntary campaign from vending machine manufacturers to warn that rocking or tilting the machines could cause serious injury or death, including placing warning labels on all machines.Morford, Mark (18 July 2001). Death By Vending Machine / Warning: Large heavy appliances can be hazardous to your health, San Francisco Chronicle The U.S. military started putting warning labels on machines in the late 1980s after a number of incidents on military installations.(2 January 1996). Newest Safety tip: Tilting a vending machine can be hazardous to your health, Toledo Blade

The vast majority of injuries and deaths have happened to men.

The argument that death by a vending machine is more likely to occur than something like winning the Powerball lottery, has drawn more attention to these unusual deaths. One 2012 report states that the odds of winning Powerball are 1 in 175 million, versus 1 in 112 million of getting killed by a vending machine. The deaths have also at times been associated with "Darwin Awards".

Prevention 

To prevent injury and death by vending machine, tools are available that also double as theft prevention devices, including cages, alarms, and security cameras. Anti-tip brackets that also double as earthquake damage mitigation devices can be another solution, as well as stickers that warn of alarms and the dangers of tipping the machines. Researchers have also noted that public awareness campaigns can dramatically decrease the number of injuries and deaths associated with vending machines.

References

Causes of death
Vending machines